This is a list of ambassadors to Finland. Note that some ambassadors are responsible for more than one country while others are directly accredited to Helsinki

Current Ambassadors to Finland

See also
 Foreign relations of Finland
 List of diplomatic missions of Finland
 List of diplomatic missions in Finland

References

External links
  Edustuston päälliköiden arvojärjestys

 
 
Finland